The Interstate Wire Act of 1961, often called the Federal Wire Act, is a United States federal law prohibiting the operation of certain types of betting businesses in the United States. It begins with the text:

Several legal opinions and rulings have discussed whether forms of gambling other than sports betting fall within the Act's scope.

Background 

After being selected to become US Attorney General, Robert F. Kennedy suggested to the 87th United States Congress to pass legislation which would make interstate gambling illegal. Kennedy's goal of the legislation was to help the United States Justice Department stop organized crime from trafficking. One of the eight bills given to Congress was Senate Bill 1656—The Wire Act.

Signing 
The Interstate Anti-Crime Acts were signed by the 35th President of the United States John F. Kennedy on September 13, 1961.

Applicability to gambling other than sports betting

In September 2011, the US Department of Justice released to the public a formal legal opinion on the scope of the Act concluding, "interstate transmissions of wire communications that do not relate to a 'sporting event or contest' fall outside the reach of the Wire Act."

A new Department of Justice opinion dated November 2, 2018 reversed the 2011 opinion, declaring that the Wire Act's prohibitions are "not uniformly limited to gambling on sporting events or contests."

The U.S. Fifth Circuit Court of Appeals has ruled that the Wire Act prohibition on the transmission of wagers applies only to sports betting and not other types of online gambling. The Supreme Court has not ruled on the meaning of the Federal Wire Act as it pertains to online gambling. In an opinion issued November 2018 and published January 2019, the Department of Justice stated that the Federal Wire Act applies to all gambling and not just sports betting.

On January 15, 2019, Deputy Attorney General Rod Rosenstein announced that the Department of Justice would delay enforcement of the 2018 OLC opinion for 90 days to "give businesses that relied on the 2011 OLC opinion time to bring their operations into compliance with federal law."

On February 15, 2019, the New Hampshire Lottery Commission filed a complaint in the US District Court for New Hampshire, naming the Department of Justice and Attorney General William Barr as defendants. The suit asks the Court to vacate and set aside the OLC's new opinion, which the Commission claims will reduce its annual profits by millions of dollars. New Hampshire Gov. Chris Sununu said the state wasn't interested in negotiating an out-of-court settlement, "we're looking to win."

On June 3, 2019, U.S. District Court Judge Paul Barbadoro issued a summary judgment that the Wire Act "is limited to sports gambling" and set aside the 2018 OLC opinion. A Department of Justice spokesperson said the government was reviewing the decision. On August 16, 2019, the Department of Justice filed notice of its intention to appeal Barbadoro's ruling to the U.S. First Circuit Court of Appeals. On January 20, 2021, Circuit Court Judge William Joseph Kayatta Jr. affirmed the district court's decision.

In November 2021, International Game Technology filed a lawsuit against the DOJ (Department of Justice) over the Federal Wire Act. IGT’s attorneys presented their case in the District Court of Rhode Island, claiming that the opinion issued by the DOJ’s Office of Legal Counsel in 2018 during the Donald Trump Administration had forced the biggest iGaming company in the United States to spend resources on potential lawsuits filed by the government. Their goal was to make the court declare the 2018 opinion unlawful.

On February 24, 2022, the Department of Justice filed a motion to dismiss IGT’s lawsuit. The DOJ representatives said that “the company (IGT) didn’t provide sufficient evidence to confirm its claim that there’s a threat of prosecution.” The DOJ’s office has once again stated the Federal Wire Act does not apply to lottery and casino services. IGT asked for additional time to respond to these arguments.

See also
Gambling in the United States

Notes

References

External links 
Wire Act at Gambling-law-us.com

1961 in American law
87th United States Congress
Wire Act
United States federal criminal legislation
Wire Act